The Music Made Me Do It is the fifteenth studio album by American rock musician Ted Nugent. It is the first album to feature drummer Jason Hartless.

Background 
Ted Nugent remarked in an October 2018 interview that he thought fans "would like" the album's content.

The Music Made Me Do It was released on November 9, 2018, through Round Hill 9 records.

Content 
Describing the albums' musical style, Ted Nugent proclaimed the record to be "so real rhythm and blues Rock & Roll".

Track listing 
All tracks written by Ted Nugent.

"The Music Made Me Do It"
"Where Ya Gonna Run to Get Away from Yourself"
"Cocked, Locked & Ready to Rock"
"BigFunDirtyGrooveNoize"
"I Love You Too Much Baby"
"BackStrap Fever"
"I Just Wanna Go Huntin"
"Fred Bear (Acoustic)"
"Sunrize"
"Sunrize (Fender Bass VI Solo)"

Personnel 
 Ted Nugent – guitars, vocals, bass on "Sunrize (Fender Bass VI Solo)"
 Greg Smith – bass
 Jason Hartless – drums
 3 Coneys and a Slice – backing vocals

Notes

References 

2018 albums
Ted Nugent albums